The 19303/19304 Indore - Bhopal Express also known as Raatrani Express is an express train which runs between  Indore Junction railway station of Indore, the largest city & commercial hub of Central Indian state Madhya Pradesh and Bhopal Junction railway station of Bhopal, the capital city of Madhya Pradesh.

Coach Composition

The train consists of 14 coaches :

 1 AC III Tier
 3 Sleepar Class
 8 General Unreserved
 2 Seating cum Luggage Rake

Service

The 19303/Indore - Bhopal Express has an average speed of 46 km/hr and covers 263 km in 5 hrs 45 mins.

The 19304/Bhopal - Indore Express has an average speed of 47 km/hr and covers 263 km in 5 hrs 35 mins.

Route and halts

The important halts of the train are :

 
 
 
 
 Bercha
 Akodia
 
 Kalapipal
 Jabri

Schedule

Rake Sharing 

The train shares its rake with:

 Indore – Bhandarkund Panchvalley Fast Passenger
 Chhindwara – Indore Panchvalley Fast Passenger
 Indore – Maksi Passenger
 Bhopal – Ujjain Passenger
 Bhandarkund – Betul Passenger
 Betul – Chhindwara Passenger

Traction

Both trains are hauled by a Vadodara Loco Shed based WAP 5 or WAP 4E electric locomotives.

See also

 Indore Junction
 Bhopal Junction

References

Transport in Indore
Transport in Bhopal
Railway services introduced in 1989
Rail transport in Madhya Pradesh
Express trains in India